is a passenger railway station in located in the town of Ōdai, Taki District, Mie Prefecture, Japan, operated by Central Japan Railway Company (JR Tōkai).

Lines

Station layout
The station consists of two opposed side platforms, connected by a footbridge. The station is unattended.

Platforms

History 
Tochihara Station opened on 20 March 1923, as a station on the Japanese Government Railways (JGR) Kisei-East Line. The line was extended on to Kawazoe Station on 20 November 1923. The JGR became the Japan National Railways (JNR) after World War II, and the line was renamed the Kisei Main Line on 15 July 1959. The station has been unattended since 21 December 1983. The station was absorbed into the JR Central network upon the privatization of the JNR on 1 April 1987. The station building was reconstructed in February 2000.

Passenger statistics
In fiscal 2019, the station was used by an average of 117 passengers daily (boarding passengers only).

Surrounding area
Kawazoe Shrine
 Japan National Route 42
 Odai Municipal Nissin Elementary School

See also
List of railway stations in Japan

References

External links

 JR Central timetable 

Railway stations in Japan opened in 1923
Railway stations in Mie Prefecture
Ōdai